Lucious is a masculine given name, popular in the United States. Notable people with the name include:

Given name
 Lucious Boyd (born 1959), American serial killer
 Lucious Harris (born 1970), American basketball player
 Lucious Jackson (1941–2022), American basketball player
 Lucious Grandson Kanyumba (born 1972), Malawi politician
 Lucious Lyon, fictional character from the television series Empire
 Lucious Selmon (21st century), American football defensive lineman
 Lucious Smith (born 1957), American football cornerback

Surname
 Korie Lucious (born 1989), American basketball player

See also
 Lucius
 Lucius (disambiguation)
 Luscious (disambiguation)

Latin masculine given names